Korotkoye is a rural locality (a selo) in Korochansky District, Belgorod Oblast, Russia. The population was 610 as of 2010. There are 5 streets.

Geography 
Korotkoye is located 12 km north of Korocha (the district's administrative centre) by road. Krivoy is the nearest rural locality.

References 

Rural localities in Korochansky District